The Collège communautaire du Nouveau-Brunswick (CCNB) is a French-language institution of post-secondary education founded in 1970, that serves all the Francophone and Acadian communities in New Brunswick through its five campuses in Bathurst, Campbellton, Dieppe, Edmundston and the Acadian Peninsula.

Campus 
 CCNB-Bathurst and head office
 CCNB-Campbellton
 CCNB-Dieppe
 CCNB-Edmundston
 CCNB-Péninsule acadienne

See also 
 Higher education in New Brunswick
 List of universities and colleges in New Brunswick

References

External links 
 

 
French-language universities and colleges in New Brunswick
1970 establishments in New Brunswick
Educational institutions established in 1970